The Western Album is an album by American singer-songwriter Don McLean, released in 2003.

Track listing
 "Timber Trail" (Tim Spencer) – 3:01
 "Ridin' Down the Canyon" (Gene Autry, S. Burnett) – 2:13
 "Pal O' Mine" (Bob Nolan) – 2:18
 "I Ride an Old Paint" (Public Domain) – 2:53
 "I've Got Spurs (That Jingle)" (Lilley, Frank Loesser) – 2:47
 "The Trail to Mexico" (Public Domain) – 4:03
 "Blue Prairie" (Nolan, Tim Spencer) – 2:59
 "The Wild West Is Where I Wanna Be" (T. Lehrer) – 4:21
 "Tulsa Time/Deep in the Heart of Texas" (Public Domain, M. Walkins) – 4:10
 "Lyndon Has a Bear Hug on Dallas" (Don McLean) – 3:26
 "(Take Me Back to My) Boots and Saddles" (Powell, Samuels, Whitcup) – 3:38
 "Song of the Bandit" (Bob Nolan) – 3:03
 "Philadelphia Lawyer" (Woody Guthrie) – 3:36
 "I'm an Old Cowhand" (Johnny Mercer) – 2:02
 "Sioux Indians" (Public Domain) – 3:53
 "My Saddle Pal and I" (Rogers) – 1:40

References

Western, The
2003 albums